Rita Yahan-Farouz, also known mononymously as Rita (formerly Rita Kleinstein ), is an Israeli pop singer and actress.

In 2011, she became popular in Iran after the release of various pop records which she sings in her native Persian language. In 2012, produced by Amer Payami, her album All My Joys, also sung in Persian, was popular in Israel and Iran, going gold in Israel after three weeks. She has since been referred to as a cultural ambassador between Israeli and Iranian citizens, and states she hopes to "puncture the wall of tension" between their countries.

Early life
Rita Yahan-Farouz was born in Tehran, Iran, to a Persian-Jewish family. At the age of eight, her family immigrated to Israel with her, and resided in the city of Ramat HaSharon, Israel, in 1970. Her niece is Israeli actress and singer Liraz Charhi.

She began singing professionally as a military band member while serving in the Israel Defense Forces during the 1980s, and rose to stardom quickly. Rita was married to Israeli singer, composer, and keyboardist Rami Kleinstein, with whom she has two daughters, Meshi and Noam. The couple performed together in 2001. In 2007, they announced they were separating.

Singing and acting career

Rita began her career in 1980 as part of a musical troupe in the Israel Defense Forces. In 1982, she attended the "Beit Zvi" school of acting. Her first exposure to the general public in Israel was at the 1986 Pre-Eurovision Song Contest (known as the Kdam-Eurovision), which decided who would represent Israel in the upcoming Eurovision Song Contest.

Rita did not win, but her song, Shvil haBrichah garnered much interest. That same year, Rita starred in a production of My Fair Lady and released her self-titled debut album, Rita, which went triple platinum, selling over 120,000 copies. In 1987, she released the English language album Breaking Those Walls under the name of Rita Farouz. That album contained several English versions of her Hebrew songs from the first album as well as original material. Despite going gold (20,000 copies) in Israel, that album was not an international success.

In 1988, Rita released her second album, Yemei Ha'Tom (The Days of Innocence), which was produced by her then husband, Rami Kleinstein, and which included a song by Israeli playwright Hanoch Levin. In 1988 and 1989 she was chosen as Singer of the Year by Israel's national radio station.

In 1990, Rita represented Israel in the Eurovision Song Contest with Shara Barkhovot (Singing in the Streets), but only achieved 18th place. After a brief hiatus, Rita returned in 1994 with her third album, Ahava Gedola (A Great Love), which led to a three-year tour around the country. Tahanot Bazman (Stations in Time) was released in 1996, consisting mainly of previously unreleased material.

In 1995, Rita voiced Pocahontas in the Hebrew dubbed version of the animated Disney film Pocahontas, including the songs. In 1998, Rita was invited to sing the Israeli national anthem Hatikvah (The Hope) at Israel's jubilee celebration Paamonei ha'yovel (The Jubilee Bells). There was a minor uproar concerning her fee, which was deemed exorbitant by some, but she was convinced to appear following a call from Prime Minister Benjamin Netanyahu. She reportedly donated the money to charity.

In 1999, Rita released Tiftakh Halon (Open a Window),  followed by Hamtzan (Oxygen) in 2003. In 2004, Rita played the role of Roxie Hart in an adaptation of Chicago for the Beit Lessin Theater.

In 2006, Rita appeared in a show called One (in English) which ran for a month at the Israel Trade Fairs & Convention Center. Directed by Hanoch Rosenn and choreographed by Mitch Sebastian, it included lasers, flamethrowers, 3-D images, smoke machines and forty dancers, acrobats, and actors. Over 100,000 tickets were sold.
In 2008, Rita released her 7th album, Remazim (Clues), her first in five years.

In 2010 she performed  at the President's Residence in Jerusalem in the presence of Italian prime minister Silvio Berlusconi and Israeli president Shimon Peres. She sang her musical version to Bialik's poem Hachnisini tachat knafekh ("Put me under your wings") and an aria in Italian.

Deciding to create a song in her childhood language of Persian, which she speaks fluently, she introduced the single, "Shaneh" based on traditional Persian folk music, but modernized with a more pop and techno dance beat.  She released her new Persian single, "Shaneh", on June 22, 2011. Iranians of all ages responded "overwhelmingly," including sending her emails and writing on her Facebook page.

Most Westernized popular music, including hers, is banned in Iran, which filters the Internet, however fans have downloaded or bought bootleg copies of her albums. Iranians living in other countries flooded her recording studio with messages, especially after the release of her 2012 album, All My Joys, also in Persian. It was certified gold in Israel within three weeks of its release.

Despite her popularity in Iran, the Iranian government called her music a "plot" to win over the hearts and minds of Iranians, and part of Israel's "soft war" against Iran. She was also criticized for sending good wishes to Iranians for Nowruz, the Iranian New Year.

Awards and recognition
In 2013, a documentary about her album in Persian was directed by Ayal Goldberg. It was shown at the Lincoln Center in New York City during the New York Jewish Film Festival in 2014. In Australia, it was shown in Melbourne, Sydney, Canberra, Adelaide and Perth during the AICE Israeli Film Festival in August 2014.

Discography

Studio albums
 1986: Rita (4× Platinum)
 1987: Breaking Those Walls (Gold)
 1988: Yamey Ha-Tom (The Days of Innocence) (5× Gold)
 1994: Ahava Gdola (A Great Love) (4× Platinum)
 1999: Tiftah Halon (Open a Window) (2× Platinum)
 2000: Time For Peace (Gold)
 2003: Hamtsan (Oxygen) (Gold)
 2008: Remazim (Hints) (Platinum)
 2012: HaSmachot Sheli (My Joys) (Gold)
 2015: Heaven Sent
 2017: Nisim Shqufim (Transparent Miracles)

Compilation albums
 1996: Tahanot BaZman (Stages in Time) (2× Platinum)
 2015: Rita - haOsef (Rita: The Collection)

Live album
 1998: Ahava Gdola - Hahofaa (A Great Love - The Show)
 2001: Rita & Rami On Stage (5× Gold)
 2007: ONE (Live) (Gold)

See also
Persian Jews
Music of Israel

References

Sources
Friedman, Motti. "Rita." The Department for Jewish Zionist Education web site, retrieved August 19, 2006.
 Griver, Simon. "The Ingathering of the Exiles." Israel Ministry of Foreign Affairs web site, retrieved March 25, 2005.
 Hartog, Kelly. "Diva Sings Out About Her Tour, Fans". The Jewish Journal of Greater Los Angeles, January 4, 2005. Retrieved March 25, 2005.
 Pri, Tal. "Behind the Curtains of 'Chicago'" (in Hebrew). nrg Maariv, retrieved March 25, 2005.

External links

Official YouTube page - live performances
Persian-Israeli singer Rita performs Hayedeh's "Gol-e Sangam"

1962 births
Living people
Beit Zvi School for the Performing Arts alumni
MTV Europe Music Award winners
Eurovision Song Contest entrants of 1990
Iranian emigrants to Israel
Israeli Jews
Eurovision Song Contest entrants for Israel
21st-century Israeli women singers
Israeli film actresses
Israeli folk singers
Israeli Sephardi Jews
Israeli musical theatre actresses
Israeli people of Iranian-Jewish descent
Israeli rock singers
Jewish Israeli actresses
Jewish Israeli musicians
Israeli Mizrahi Jews
Jewish folk singers
20th-century Israeli women singers